Ashok Kumar Balakrishnan is an Indian actor who has appeared in South Indian film industry.

Filmography

Films 
All films are in Tamil, unless otherwise noted.

Web series

Television

References

External links 

 

Tamil male actors
Living people
Indian male film actors
Male actors from Tamil Nadu
People from Thanjavur district
St. Xavier's College, Mumbai alumni
Year of birth missing (living people)